Coelogyne rochussenii is a species of orchid.

rochussenii